The National Organization of Bessarabia "Arcașii lui Ștefan" (Romanian:Organizaţia Națională din Basarabia "Arcașii lui Ștefan") was one of the organized anti-Soviet groups in Bessarabia right after World War II.

Activity 
The National Organization of Bessarabia was formed in October 1945, on the territory of the former Soroca County by teachers Vasile Bătrânac, Victor Solovei, Nicolae Prăjină, Teodosie Guzun, and Anton Romașcan, as well as a student, Nichita Brumă. The organization took the name "Arcașii lui Ștefan" in October 1946; by March 1947, it had more than 140 members.

On 23 March 1947, Bătrânac was arrested by the NKVD secret police, who found a detailed list of the organization's members in his possession. Shortly after, all members, including the other leaders of "Arcașii lui Ștefan", were apprehended by the Soviet authorities. On 11 June, Bătrânac was sentenced to 25 years forced labor and sent to a camp in Siberia.

Gallery

Bibliography
 Ștefan Tudor, Organizația Națională din Basarabia "Arcașii lui Ștefan", Basarabia, 1992, nr.9
 Mitru Ghițiu, Unele aspecte din mișcarea de rezistență antisovietică în Basarabia postbelică, Analele Sighet 2, Instaurarea comunismului - între rezistență și represiune, Fundația Academia Civică, 1995
 Ștefan Tudor, Vsia jizni v plenu, în Nezavisimaia Moldova, 1993, 15 septembrie
 Ștefan Tudor, O.N.B. "Arcașii lui Ștefan" în Lit. și Arta, nr. 14, 16, 19, 21, 24, 25, 26 1997, aprilie-iunie
 Mihail Ursachi, Organizația Națională din Basarabia Arcașii lui Ștefan: Amintiri, Muzeum
 Elena Postică, Rezistența antisovietică în Basarabia. 1944–1950, Chișinău, 1997
 Valeriu Pasat, Trudnâe stranițî istorii Moldovî. 1940–1950 [Documente] (Pages difficiles d'histoire de la Moldavie), Moscova, Ed. Terra, 1994

External links 
 "Moș Ion de la Mândâc" – un basarabean în temniță cu Soljenițîn
 I. Bucătaru, Specificul sistemului politic moldovenesc în perioada sovietică (1944–1988)

Notes

Defunct political parties in Moldova
Moldavian Soviet Socialist Republic
Clandestine groups
Anti-communist organizations
Anti-communism in Moldova
Organizations established in 1945
Hîncești District
History of Soroca
Soviet occupation of Bessarabia and Northern Bukovina
Organizations disestablished in 1947